Jonas Enkerud (born 25 April 1990) is a Norwegian footballer who plays as a forward for HamKam.

Career
He signed a contract with HamKam in December 2018. He took part in the club's promotion from the 2021 First Division, scoring 13 goals. On 2 April 2022, he made his Eliteserien debut against Lillestrøm, scoring one of the goals in a 2–2 draw.

References

External links

1990 births
Living people
Norwegian footballers
Nybergsund IL players
Eidsvold TF players
Elverum Fotball players
Hamarkameratene players
Norwegian Second Division players
Norwegian First Division players
Eliteserien players
Association football forwards